Brighstone Down is a chalk down on the Isle of Wight.
Towards the west part is called Mottistone Down, to the East, Shorwell Down.

The Northern part is covered by Brighstone Forest the largest forest on the Island.

On 19 November 1947, an BOAC Short S.25 Sunderland 3 (G-AGHW) was on a ferry flight from Hythe Seaplane Base to Poole Seaplane Base. The aircraft crashed into Brighstone Down in bad weather caused by to pilot error, killing One of the Four crew.

Notes

Hills of the Isle of Wight
Marilyns of England
Mountains and hills of the United Kingdom with toposcopes
Aviation accidents and incidents locations in England
Brighstone